Klingbeil is a surname. Notable people with the surname include: 

Chuck Klingbeil (1965–2018), American football player
Ike Klingbeil (1908–1995), American hockey player
Lars Klingbeil (born 1978), German politician
René Klingbeil (born 1981), German footballer and coach

Occupational surnames